Statistics during the 2013–14 SVB Hoffdklasse season.

League table

References 

SVB Eerste Divisie seasons
1
Surinam